Memoria Chilena (Spanish for Chilean Memory) is a Chilean cultural website which, according to its own words, "offers investigations and documents related to key topics which make up the Chilean identity, accessible through the areas of history, literature, social sciences, music, and visual arts." Memoria Chilena is, also, a virtual library, which preserves material from the Biblioteca Nacional de Chile and other institutions from the Dirección de Bibliotecas, Archivos y Museos (DIBAM).

History
The original idea of Memoria Chilena was conceived in 2001. The website states that, "until now, our objective has been to spread through the Internet the cultural heritage of Chile, contributing to the recuperation, preservation and strengthening of our historic memory."

Organization
Memoria Chilena organizes its material through topic sites (sitios temáticos), which "approach processes, events, people or relevant works from the Chilean cultural and historic imaginary." Topic sites include a general presentation or description, galleries of images, digitized documents, related bibliography, chronology, links to related topic sites or websites, and sound files. Memoria Chilena, as of May 2012, had 2,800 digitized books, 250 maps of Chile (dated between 1768 and 1929), in addition to an "innumerable" quantity of photographs related to the Chilean history.

Copyright
Memoria Chilena publishes documents and images which belong to collections of the National Library of Chile and other institutions of the DIBAM, which are property of this latter or are otherwise in the public domain. However, digitized materials whose copyright status is active, are used with permission from the copyright owners, for their "exclusive publication in the website." The website also states that "any use of the material published in Memoria Chilena without consent of the copyright owners, is penalized by the Law of Intellectual Property."

Notes

References

External links
 Memoria Chilena 

Internet properties established in 2001
Chilean educational websites
History websites
Biblioteca Nacional de Chile
Chilean online encyclopedias